Vitor Gava Anselmo (born 20 May 1991), commonly known as Vitor Gava, is a Brazilian football defender. He is currently playing for Noroeste.

Club career
He was a former captain of Brazilian club Arapongas. On 14 January 2014, FK Senica announced that the club signed two-and-half year contract with Vitor Gava.

External links

Brasoccer Profile

References

1991 births
Living people
Association football defenders
Brazilian footballers
Brazilian expatriate footballers
FK Senica players
Slovak Super Liga players
Expatriate footballers in Slovakia
Brazilian expatriate sportspeople in Slovakia
Footballers from São Paulo (state)